A name sometimes applied to some of the blue Aeshna dragonfly species (Mosaic Darners/Hawkers), typically species found in North America, such as the Blue-eyed Darner, "Aeshna multicolour", as the members of the genus are not referred to as 'Darners' in other English speaking countries.

References 

Aeshnidae
Insect common names